Elk, California may refer to:
Elk, Fresno County, California
Elk, Mendocino County, California